Michael Wolff (born 1933), is a British graphic designer and consultant on brands and corporate identity.

In 1965 he co-founded Wolff Olins, with Wally Olins, a brand consultancy with clients that included Apple Records, Volkswagen and Audi. Wolff is patron of the Inclusive Design Challenge with the Helen Hamlyn Centre at the Royal College of Art (RCA), a member of the Government sponsored Design and Technology Alliance against crime and former chairman of the Legible London initiative with Transport for London, a visiting professor at the University of the Arts in London and a senior fellow of the RCA. He is a former president of both the D&AD (Design and Art Directors Association) and the Chartered Society of Designers. He is  also an RDI (a member of the RSA's Faculty of Royal Designers for Industry).

He runs Michael Wolff & Company in London.

Biography
He studied architecture and started his career as a product designer and later became an interior designer before going into graphic design.

References

Royal College of Art
1933 births
Living people
British graphic designers
British company founders